Louisiana Ragin' Cajuns is the nickname of the University of Louisiana at Lafayette athletic teams.

Ragin' Cajun may also refer to:

People
James Carville (born 1944), political consultant
Russel L. Honoré (born 1947), U.S. Army Lieutenant General
Doug Kershaw (born 1936), fiddler
John LeRoux, wrestler
Hal Martin (born 1985), racing driver
Peter Mandelson (born 1953), politician

Other uses
Clash of the Champions VI: Ragin' Cajun, a pay-for-view wrestling event (1989)
Gambit (Marvel Comics), fictional character from the X-Men comics, is referred to by Wolverine as the Ragin' Cajun
Ragin' Cajun (roller coaster), a roller coaster at Six Flags America
Steamin' Demon, a relocated roller coaster with the former name Ragin' Cajun
Ragin' Cajun (film), a 1991 film featuring Charlene Tilton
Ragin' Cajuns (TV series), a 2012 Discovery Channel series

See also
Cajun (disambiguation)